Eliza Butler Kirkbride School is a K-8 school located in the Passyunk Square neighborhood of Philadelphia, Pennsylvania. It is a part of the School District of Philadelphia.

The historic school building was designed by Irwin T. Catharine and built in 1925–1926. It is a four-story, five bay, yellow reinforced concrete building faced in brick and limestone in the Late Gothic Revival-style. It features a projecting central entrance with floral and heraldic plaques in the spandrel, decorative panels, and a crenellated parapet. Each register contains three openings with limestone sills and lintels. A limestone dripcourse appears over the basement openings. The projecting end registers feature window bands with ornamental panels between the floors. These panels were a standard feature on some of Catharine's designs and often contained the datestone as one of the decorative panels.

It was added to the National Register of Historic Places in 1988.

History
By 1990 the school had a Head Start Program preschool program.

Demographics
In 1999 the school had 660 students, with over 50% of them being Asian.

In the 1998–1999 school year the school began a pilot bilingual English-Cambodian (Khmer) program for its immigrant students. By 1999 the school provided basic Cambodian lessons for the non-Cambodian students. In 1999 Cambodians made up almost 33% of the total student body.

As of 2015 the school has an English Language Learner (ELL) program with 200 students, with support from Chinese, Khmer, and Vietnamese-speaking counselor assistants, in addition to a bilingual counselor who speaks Chinese and Vietnamese.

Feeder patterns
Neighborhoods assigned to Kirkbride are also assigned to Furness High School.

Gallery

References

External links
 Eliza B. Kirkbride School
 
 "Elizabeth B. Kirkbride Elementary School Geographic Boundaries" (Archive). School District of Philadelphia.

School buildings on the National Register of Historic Places in Philadelphia
Gothic Revival architecture in Pennsylvania
School buildings completed in 1926
Passyunk Square, Philadelphia
Public K–8 schools in Philadelphia
School District of Philadelphia
1926 establishments in Pennsylvania